Dark tourism (also Thana tourism (as in Thanatos), black tourism, morbid tourism, or grief tourism) has been defined as tourism involving travel to places historically associated with death and tragedy. More recently, it was suggested that the concept should also include reasons tourists visit that site, since the site's attributes alone may not make a visitor a "dark tourist". The main attraction to dark locations is their historical value rather than their associations with death and suffering. Holocaust tourism contains aspects of both dark tourism and heritage tourism.

Dark tourism deals with the philosophical interrogation on death. Visitors who are interested in these spaces manifest their intention to understand others' pain or simply educational goals. Dark tourists imagine often their own finitude through the figure of the Other. Dark tourism helps to enhance the recipient capacity of society as well as giving a lesson to next generations.

Field of study
While there is a long tradition of people visiting recent and ancient settings of death, such as travel to gladiator games in the Roman colosseum, attending public executions by decapitation, and visiting the catacombs, this practice has been studied academically only relatively recently.
Travel writers were the first to describe their tourism to deadly places. P. J. O'Rourke called his travel to Warsaw, Managua, and Belfast in 1988 'holidays in hell', or Chris Rojek talking about 'black-spot' tourism in 1993 or the 'milking the macabre'.
Academic attention to the subject originated in Glasgow, Scotland: The term 'dark tourism' was coined in 1996 by Lennon and Foley, two faculty members of the Department of Hospitality, Tourism & Leisure Management at Glasgow Caledonian University, and the term 'thanatourism' was first mentioned by A. V. Seaton in 1996, then Professor of Tourism Marketing at the University of Strathclyde.

As of 2014, there have been many studies on definitions, labels, and subcategorizations, such as Holocaust tourism and slavery-heritage tourism, and the term continues to be molded outside academia by authors of travel literature. There is very little empirical research on the perspective of the dark tourist.
Dark tourism has been formally studied from three main perspectives by a variety of different disciplines:

Hospitality and tourism
Scholars in this interdisciplinary field have examined many different aspects. Lennon and Foley expanded their original idea  in their first book, deploring that "tact and taste do not prevail over economic considerations” and that the "blame for transgressions cannot lie solely on the shoulders of the proprietors, but also upon those of the tourists, for without their demand there would be no need to supply."

Whether a tourist attraction is educational or exploitative is defined by both its operators and its visitors. Tourism operators motivated by greed can "milk the macabre" or reexamine tragedies for a learning experience. Tourists consuming dark tourism products may desecrate a place and case studies are needed to probe who gains and loses. Chris Hedges criticized the "Alcatraz narrative as presented by the National Park Service" as "whitewashing", because it "ignores the savagery and injustice of America's system of mass incarceration". By omitting challenging details, the park service furthers a "Disneyfication", per Hedges.

Example destinations
Destinations of dark tourism include castles and battlefields such as Culloden in Scotland and Bran Castle and Poienari Castle in Romania; former prisons such as Beaumaris Prison in Anglesey, Wales and the Jack the Ripper exhibition in the London Dungeon; sites of natural disasters or man made disasters, such as Hiroshima Peace Memorial Park in Japan, Chernobyl in Ukraine and the commercial activity at Ground Zero in New York one year after September 11, 2001. It also includes sites of human atrocities, murders, and genocide, such as the Auschwitz concentration camp in Poland, the Nanjing Massacre Memorial Hall in China, the Columbine High School massacre in the United States, the Tuol Sleng Genocide Museum in Cambodia; the sites of the Jeju Uprising in South Korea and the Spirit Lake Internment Camp Centre near La Ferme, Quebec as an example of Canada's internment operations of 1914–1920.

In Bali "death and funeral rites have become commodified for tourism ..., where enterprising businesses begin arranging tourist vans and sell tickets as soon as they hear someone is dying." In the U.S., visitors can tour the Holocaust Memorial Museum in Washington D.C. "with an identity card which matches their age and gender with that of a name and photo of a real holocaust victim. Against a backdrop of video interpretation portraying killing squads in action, the pseudo Holocaust victim enters a personal ID into monitors as they wander around the attraction to discover how their real-life counterpart is faring." In Colombia, places associated with Pablo Escobar, the drug lord from the Medellín Cartel, became hotspots for dark tourism through Escobar-themed tours. In Medellín, visitors frequent Roberto Escobar's private museum of his infamous brother, the house where he was killed, and La Catedral, Escobar's prison. Another famous place is the Haciénda Nápoles estate located between Bogotá and Medellín, near Puerto Triunfo.

See also 
 Dark Tourist (television series)
 Disaster tourism
 Slum tourism
 War tourism

Notes

Further reading
 
 Seraphin, Hugues. "Terrorism and tourism in France: the limitations of dark tourism." Worldwide Hospitality and Tourism Themes 9.2 (2017): 187-195. online

External links 
"What is dark tourism?", The Guardian special feature
Chernobyl: Unlikely Tourist Spot  - slideshow by Life magazine

Cultural tourism
Grief
Cultural aspects of death
Types of tourism